Katie Uhlaender (born July 17, 1984) is an American skeleton racer who has competed since 2003. She has won six medals at the FIBT World Championships with two gold (women's skeleton: FIBT World Championships 2012, mixed bobsleigh-skeleton team event: 2012), one silver (women's skeleton: 2008), and three bronze (women's skeleton: 2007, mixed bobsleigh-skeleton team event: 2008, 2009).

Career
Uhlaender won the women's Skeleton World Cup title twice (2006-7, 2007-8). She also finished sixth in the women's skeleton event at the 2006 Winter Olympics in Turin. She earned a medical waiver to compete in the 2009-10 Skeleton World Cup season following surgery in the wake of an April 2009 snowmobile accident where Uhelander shattered her kneecap. She then broke it again in August 2009 (having a total of four surgeries). She qualified for the 2010 Winter Olympics in Vancouver, where she finished 11th.  She then had another surgery (microfracture labral repair by Dr Phillipon at Steadman Hawkins). On January 18, 2014, Uhlaender was named to the 2014 Olympic team. She placed fourth at the 2014 Olympics, missing out on a medal by .04 seconds.

Uhlaender has also participated in weightlifting competitions. The 2012 U.S. Olympic trials were just the third meet of her weightlifting career, but she did not make the team. Discovering that her hip had ossified (there was no soft tissue) and her ankle had a hole in it, she took the 2014-15 season off from skeleton and gave up on weightlifting to get healthy. She participated in track cycling, attempting to be a starter in the women's team sprint. She posted her best one-lap time of 20.7 at Senior Nationals 2015.

Uhlaender was named, along with Kendall Wesenberg, to represent the U.S. in women's skeleton at the 2018 Winter Olympics in Pyeongchang.

In July 2018, Uhlaender testified before the U.S. Helsinki Commission in Washington, DC, on the subject of doping in sports. She was on a panel alongside Travis Tygart, CEO of the U.S. Anti-Doping Administration, Jim Walden, the attorney for Russian whistleblower Dr. Grigory Rodchenkov, and Yuliya Stepanova, a former Russian track star turned whistleblower. Uhlaender told the body that she felt she was twice unfairly denied an Olympic medal. The loss "erased the meaning of sport and the Olympics as I knew it."

Personal life
A native of Vail, Colorado, Uhlaender lives in nearby Breckenridge while training, but lives in McDonald, Kansas the rest of the year. She is the daughter of Major League Baseball outfielder (and former Cleveland Indians coach) Ted Uhlaender. In memory of her father, she wears his National League Championship ring from the 1972 Cincinnati Reds on a necklace.

References

External links
 
 
 
 
 . October 26, 2009. Accessed October 27, 2009.
 
 
 "Meet Katie Uhlaender, Skeleton". AP Winter Games, February 2010.
 Athlete Profile: Katie Uhlaender. AP Winter Games, February 2010. 
 NBCOlympics.com on the bobsleigh and skeleton slots for the US Team for the 2010 Winter Olympics. January 16, 2010. Accessed January 17, 2010. 
 List of women's skeleton World Cup champions since 1997 at Sports123.com 
 Women's skeleton world championship medalists since 2000 at Sports123.com 
 Skeletonsport.com profile

1984 births
American female skeleton racers
Living people
Olympic skeleton racers of the United States
People from Vail, Colorado
Skeleton racers at the 2006 Winter Olympics
Skeleton racers at the 2010 Winter Olympics
Skeleton racers at the 2014 Winter Olympics
Skeleton racers at the 2018 Winter Olympics
Skeleton racers at the 2022 Winter Olympics
Sportspeople from Colorado
21st-century American women
20th-century American women